Master of His Own Body (Svoga tela gospodar) is a 1957 Croatian film by Fedor Hanžeković.

Sources
 Svoga tela gospodar at lzmk.hr

External links
 

1957 films
1950s Croatian-language films
Yugoslav comedy-drama films
Jadran Film films
Films set in 1928
Croatian comedy-drama films
1957 comedy-drama films
Croatian black-and-white films